Reena Virk (March 10, 1983 – November 14, 1997) was a resident of Saanich, British Columbia, Canada. Her status as a bullied murder victim attracted substantial media scrutiny in Canada. Virk was beaten and killed by a group of teenagers, one of whom was given a life sentence after being convicted of second-degree murder. Another was tried three times for the crime. The verdict of her third trial, a conviction, was set aside. The verdict was appealed to the Supreme Court of Canada which ruled not to hold a fourth trial in an 8–1 decision, upholding the conviction and sentence.

The Globe and Mail commented at the time that her case was "elevated into a national tragedy." A pair of Canadian sociologists have described the case as a watershed moment for a "moral panic" over girl violence by the Canadian public in the late 1990s.

Reena Virk
Virk's father was an immigrant from India, while her mother came from an Indo-Canadian family who had converted from Hinduism to the Jehovah's Witness religion after arriving in Canada. Her immediate family was "a minority within a minority," as they were Jehovah's Witnesses in the local South Asian community of 3,000 which was predominantly Sikh.

Virk was described as desperate for acceptance amongst her peers, but was taunted and/or ostracized by these girls whose subculture was influenced by Los Angeles street gangs. She had begun to rebel due to such peer influence, smoking marijuana and cigarettes. Bullied for her weight and insecurity, she was said to feel restricted by the rules of the family's faith. In 1996, she falsely reported her father for sexual molestation in hopes of being moved to a foster home and having more freedom. As a result, she was moved from her family's home into the care of the state for several months in 1996. She later dropped the charges and returned home.

Murder

On the evening of Friday November 14, 1997, Reena Virk, then aged 14, was invited to a party by her friend near the Craigflower Bridge, in the city of Saanich, British Columbia.

While at the bridge, it is claimed that teenagers drank alcohol and smoked marijuana as Virk stood among them. Virk was swarmed by a group later called the Shoreline Six. Witnesses said that one of the girls, Cook, stubbed out a cigarette on Virk's forehead, and that while seven or eight others stood by and watched, Virk was repeatedly hit, punched, and kicked. She had several cigarette burns on her skin, and apparently attempts were made to set her hair on fire. This first beating ended when one of the girls told the others to stop.

Virk managed to walk away, but was followed by two members of the original group, Ellard and Glowatski. The pair dragged Virk to the other side of the bridge, made her remove her shoes and jacket, and beat her a second time. Ellard allegedly denied holding Virk's head under water, but admitted (at her day parole hearing on November 30, 2017) to rolling her beaten, unconscious body into the water.

Despite an alleged pact amongst the people involved to not "rat each other out“, by the following Monday rumors of the alleged murder spread throughout Shoreline Junior High School. Reena Virk was a student at nearby Colquitz Junior High School. Several uninvolved students and teachers heard the rumours, but no one came forward to report it to the police. The rumors were confirmed eight days later, on November 22, 1997, when the police used a helicopter to find Virk's partially clothed body washed ashore at the Gorge Inlet, a major waterway on Vancouver Island.

The coroner ruled the death was by drowning. An autopsy later revealed that Virk had sustained significant injury, and that the head injuries were severe enough to have killed her if she had not been drowned.

Perpetrators
The six female perpetrators are referred to in court documents as N.C. (Nicole Cook), N.P. (Nicole Patterson), M.G.P. (Missy Grace Pleich), C.A.K. (Courtney Keith), G.O. (Gail Ooms), and K.M.E. (Kelly Marie Ellard). All have admitted involvement. 

One girl in this group was found to be incapable of being kept in jail due to suicide attempts. This was due to PTSD from witnessing her father's violent death when she was a child.

Warren Paul Glowatski
Warren Glowatski, born April 26, 1981 in Medicine Hat, Alberta, was 16 years old when Virk was murdered. He was convicted of Virk's murder and sentenced to life in prison.

Glowatski and his parents moved around frequently; he lived in Estevan, Regina, Saskatchewan, and Castlegar, British Columbia.

In 1996, when his parents separated, Glowatski and his father moved to Nanaimo, British Columbia on Vancouver Island. In 1997, they settled in a trailer home near the southern tip of the Island in Saanich.

The following year Glowatski's father married a woman he met in Las Vegas, Nevada. Glowatski decided to remain in Saanich, living alone in the trailer and supported by money sent by his father.

On the night of Virk's murder, for unknown reasons, Glowatski involved himself in the fight and twice kicked the victim in the head. When the beating ended, Glowatski and Kelly Ellard followed Virk. According to Glowatski, Ellard smashed Virk's face into a tree knocking her out. With Glowatski's help Ellard dragged Virk into the water where Ellard drowned her.

In June 1999, Glowatski was convicted of second-degree murder and given a life sentence. Because he was 16 at the time of the murder, he was eligible for parole after serving seven years. In November 2004, he was denied his first chance at day parole.

The Virks did not contest the parole, because Glowatski expressed remorse and responsibility for his part in the murder. In July 2006, he was granted unescorted temporary absences from jail. By December 2006, Glowatski was eligible to apply for day parole again, which he was granted in June 2007.

During his incarceration, Glowatski discovered that he is Métis. This played a large role in parole hearings as he asked the parole board to incorporate his elders into the process and various healing circles and other forms of restorative justice were used, bringing Glowatski and Virk's parents together. In receiving day parole he proceeded to hug every member of the parole board and those present, including the Virks.

Warren Glowatski was released on full parole in June 2010.

Kelly Marie Ellard
Kelly Ellard (born August 9, 1982), was 15 years old when she drowned Virk. Ellard stood trial three times for the murder, and was convicted twice. Her lawyers had succeeded in having her first conviction overturned on appeal, and attempted to have her second conviction overturned. However, while a 2008 decision of the BC Court of Appeals overturned the second conviction, on June 12, 2009 the Supreme Court of Canada (Supreme Court), in an 8–1 decision, overturned the BC Court of Appeals, ruling that Ellard's third trial had been fairly executed, and her conviction would stand.

Evidence was cited in a 2005 book about the case regarding Ellard's sociopathy and violence in middle school. The reason for the absence of her birth father in her life is never revealed.

Ellard was initially convicted in March 2000 for second-degree murder in Virk's death. In February 2003, this conviction was overturned and a new trial was ordered. The second trial ended in a mistrial (as the result of a hung jury) in July 2004. A third trial was ordered and Ellard was convicted again of second-degree murder in April 2005 and given an automatic life sentence with no parole eligibility for seven years.

The BC Court of Appeals overturned the conviction based on an error by the original trial judge, but the Supreme Court ruled that her conviction stands because the error by the original trial judge was "harmless".

Ellard was granted conditional day parole in November 2017; in October 2018, when her day parole was extended, the documents from the Parole Board of Canada revealed that Ellard had changed her name to Kerry Marie Sim. Her day parole was suspended in August 2021 for failing to report domestic violence with the suspension cancelled in late October 2021.

In May 2022, the then 39-year-old Sim (Ellard) waived her right to a parole hearing, as she did not yet feel ready to return to society on a full time basis. By law, the Parole Board of Canada was still required to review her feasibility for full parole, and also deemed her unworthy of moving beyond day parole.

Nicole Cook
Nicole Cook, born 1983, lived in a group home at the time. On MSNBC's documentary Bloodlust Under the Bridge, Cook spoke about how she took a lit cigarette and put it out on Reena Virk's face, initiating the mayhem that followed. Cook further explained how she repeatedly punched and kicked Virk as she was being pummeled by the other assailants. At the end of the MSNBC interview, Cook then lambasted the accusation that she had anything to do with Virk's actual murder because Ellard was the participant charged for the murder. Veteran Dateline reporter Keith Morrison then asked, "Would the murder have ever happened if you hadn't started the fight by burning her face with your cigarette?" and Cook replied, "I don't know. Maybe."

Cook also returned to the crime scene the day after the killing, accompanied by Pleich, and retrieved Reena's shoes and sweater. They took these items back to their group home and forced another, younger resident named "Stephanie" to hide them in her closet. They also forced her to make phone calls to Suman Virk, Reena's mother, while the search for Reena was still active.

Possible motives
A book about the case, Under the Bridge by Rebecca Godfrey, details some of the motives that may have led to Virk's death. Two of the girls convicted in the initial beating allege that Virk stole a phone book from Nicole Cook and started calling Cook's friends and spreading rumours about her. Cook stubbed out a cigarette on Virk's forehead during the attack. Another girl, M.G.P, was allegedly targeting Reena because of her race alongside the others in the group such as Warren, who allegedly were known to have bullied Reena, allegedly due to this racial reason. Virk once lived with the two girls in a youth group home. It is suggested she may have done those things in order to assert herself as "tough".

The book also reveals that Virk was initially considered a runaway when her mother first reported her missing to the Saanich Police Department, the police agency in which the Virks resided. The book Under the Bridge incorrectly documented the Missing Persons report as being made to the Royal Canadian Mounted Police. Two Russian sisters, who lived in the youth group home, were prompted to contact the police upon hearing that Virk was most likely dead.

Timeline
 November 14, 1997, Reena Virk is killed
 November 22, 1997, Reena Virk's body is found
 February 9, 1998, three teenage girls plead guilty to assault causing bodily harm for their roles in the attack
 February 13, 1998, three more girls are convicted of assault causing bodily harm
 Between April and May 1998, six teenage girls are sentenced for their roles in the beating of Virk. Sentences range from 60-day conditional sentences to one year in jail
 June 1999, Warren Glowatski, the only male involved in the crime, is convicted of second-degree murder and sentenced to life in prison with no chance of parole for seven years
 March 9, 2000, Kelly Ellard (Kerry Marie Sim since 2018) is convicted of second-degree murder in adult court, where she is sentenced to life in prison with no chance of full parole for five years
 November 15, 2000, 3 years and 1 day after the murder of Reena Virk, her parents, Manjit and Suman Virk, sue the teenagers who took part in the beating, the BC government, and several other parties
 February 4, 2003, the BC Court of Appeal announces that due to improprieties in the way Ellard was questioned during her first trial, a new trial would be ordered It is impermissible for the crown to ask the accused why witnesses would lie about the accused.
 June 14, 2004, Ellard's second murder trial begins
 July 18, 2004, a mistrial is declared in Ellard's second trial after the jury declares it is deadlocked 11-1
 February 21, 2005, Kelly Ellard's third trial opens
 April 12, 2005, Ellard is found guilty of second degree murder. She is given an automatic life sentence with no parole for at least 7 years
 July 20, 2006, after serving nearly nine years of a life sentence, Warren Glowatski is granted unescorted temporary passes by the National Parole Board, moving him a step closer to becoming part of society. The Virk family supports the decision.
 August 9, 2006, Ellard appeals her conviction, asking for a fourth trial or an acquittal. Crown has the option to appeal, hold a fourth trial or abandon prosecution.
 April, 2009, Ellard's appeal goes before the Supreme Court of Canada.
 June 12, 2009, The Supreme Court of Canada reinstates the second-degree murder conviction against Kelly Ellard, putting an end to a legal case that spanned more than a decade.
 June 23, 2010, Warren Glowatski is released on parole.
 January 18, 2017, Ellard is denied parole.
 November 30, 2017, Ellard granted day parole
 October 30, 2018, Ellard's day parole extended, the ruling notes that she had changed her name to Kerry Marie Sim
 August 22, 2019, Sim (Ellard) granted overnight leaves and extended day parole.

The case in popular culture
The murder case has been the subject of Under the Bridge: The True Story of the Murder of Reena Virk (2005) by Rebecca Godfrey, which was developed into a feature film, and partly inspired a monologue play, The Shape of a Girl (2001), by Joan MacLeod, and The Beckoners by Carrie Mac. The film rights for the book Under the Bridge were purchased by Type A Productions, a film production company, for adaptation into a movie.

The murder of Reena Virk was also the subject of a thesis published in a book edited by Christine Alder and Anne Worrell titled Girls' Violence; Myths and Realities. The author of the thesis, "Racism, 'Girl Violence' and the Murder of Reena Virk", Sheila Batacharya, discusses the murder of Reena Virk from a feminist perspective and looks at why the argument from media and the police that the murder was not racially motivated may not have been entirely accurate. Batacharya also argues that the narrative of 'girl violence' which academics policy makers and journalists have asserted is evidenced by Virk's murder, obscures other investigations and explanations surrounding this murder. Reena's father, Mr. Manjit Virk, has written a book about the murder of his daughter: Reena: A Father’s Story (2008), which is highly critical of the B.C. Ministry of Children and Family Development and the B.C. justice system; Reena was murdered under the voluntary care of the Ministry, yet no apology was given or responsibility taken.

In December 2010 and 2012, students from Walkerville High School in Windsor, Ontario performed a play based on the death of Reena Virk for members of the community, as well as the Virk parents.

In 2015, Soraya Peerbaye published a series of poems dedicated to the murder of Reena Virk entitled Tell: poems for a girlhood. The book was shortlisted for the 2016 Griffin Poetry Prize.

See also
List of solved missing person cases

References

External links
 Article about the Virk murder, and addresses the issue of girl on girl violence
 A Toronto-based South Asian civil rights website and their perspective on the Reena Virk's murder and Kelly Ellard's trial
 Canadian Government Resource on aggressive girls
 of Reena Virk Timeline/Canadian Broadcasting Corporation (CBC)
 News about verdict from the third trial (defunct prior to 1/10)
 One article on the first trial
 Racism. -- Girl Violence" and the Murder of Reena Virk, Master of Arts Degree, 2000, Sheila Batacharya

1990s missing person cases
1997 deaths
1997 murders in Canada
Bullying
Canadian murder victims
Child abuse incidents and cases
Crime in British Columbia
Deaths by beating
Deaths by drowning
Deaths by person in Canada
Female murder victims
Formerly missing people
History of British Columbia
Incidents of violence against girls
Kidnapped Canadian children
Missing person cases in Canada
Murder in British Columbia
Murder in Canada
Murdered Canadian children
People murdered in British Columbia
Racism in Canada
Violence against women in Canada